The 2015 Arkansas State Red Wolves football team represented Arkansas State University in the 2015 NCAA Division I FBS football season. They were led by head coach Blake Anderson, who was the first Red Wolves head coach since Steve Roberts in 2002 to return for a second season at Arkansas State (the three coaches between Roberts and Anderson all left for other head coaching jobs after a single season). The Red Wolves, who play their home games at Centennial Bank Stadium in Jonesboro, Arkansas, are members of the Sun Belt Conference. The Red Wolves finished the regular season 9–3, 8–0 in Sun Belt play to win their fourth Sun Belt Championship in five seasons. In the New Orleans Bowl, the Red Wolves fell to Louisiana Tech 28–47.

Schedule
Arkansas State announced their 2015 football schedule on February 27, 2015. The 2015 schedule consisted of six home and away games in the regular season. The Red Wolves hosted Sun Belt foes Georgia State, Idaho, Louisiana–Lafayette, and Texas State, and traveled to Appalachian State, Louisiana–Monroe, New Mexico State, and South Alabama.

Schedule source:

Game summaries

at #8 USC

Missouri

Missouri State

at Toledo

Idaho

at South Alabama

Louisiana–Lafayette

Georgia State

at Appalachian State

at Louisiana–Monroe

at New Mexico State

Texas State

Louisiana Tech–New Orleans Bowl

References

Arkansas State
Arkansas State Red Wolves football seasons
Sun Belt Conference football champion seasons
Arkansas State Red Wolves football